The following is a complete albums discography of American country music artist Waylon Jennings. For the singles, see Waylon Jennings singles discography. For a discography as a member of The Highwaymen, see The Highwaymen discography.

Studio albums

1960s

1970s

1980s

1990s

2010s

Live albums

Compilations

Collaborations

With Willie Nelson

Other collaborations

References

External links
 Official Website

Country music discographies
Discographies of American artists